Eois decursaria is a moth in the family Geometridae. It is found on Jamaica.

References

Moths described in 1886
Eois
Moths of the Caribbean